Kenneth John Irvine (5 March 1940 – 22 December 1990), also nicknamed "Mongo", was an Australian professional rugby league footballer who played in the 1950s, 1960s and 1970s. He holds the standing Australian record for the most tries in a first-grade career – 212. No other player has yet managed 200 tries in their Australian club career, with the closest to Irvine's tally being Melbourne Storm player Billy Slater, who scored 190. He is also the 2nd all-time top try-scorer for the Australian national team with 33, two behind Darren Lockyer's 35. Irvine's great speed is legendary and he is regarded as Australia's greatest ever winger, being named in 2008 in the list of Australian rugby league's 100 greatest players, as well as being an automatic selection for the Australian Rugby League's "Team of the Century".

Irvine played his club football for the North Sydney and Manly-Warringah clubs in the New South Wales Rugby Football League premiership, winning the premiership with Manly in 1972 and 1973.

Early life
Born in Cremorne, Sydney, to John Bernard Irvine, a butcher, and his wife Doris May ( McCabe), Irvine attended Marist Brothers College Mosman. He originally excelled in both baseball and sprinting, playing in the New South Wales junior baseball side alongside future New South Wales and Australian teammate Reg Gasnier, while also competitively running for the Randwick-Botany Club. After deciding to attend a trial at Wentworth Park for the North Sydney Bears rugby league club as a 17-year-old, their first grade coach Ross McKinnon stated "sign that kid for life", and Ken was signed and playing for the club the following year.

Playing career

North Sydney Bears
Making his debut for the club on the wing in 1958, he was an instant success for the club, proving to be a frequent try scorer. After only one full club season with Norths, Irvine was selected for New South Wales in 1959. He was the 1959 NSWRFL season's leading try-scorer with 19 and was rewarded with selection in the Australian side for the 1959-60 Kangaroo tour. Irvine made his Australian debut on the tour against France at the Parc des Princes stadium in Paris on 31 October 1959.

In 1961, Irvine showcased his speed at a specially-arranged event specifically in an attempt to break professional world record over 100 yards. Irvine won the event and equaled the record of 9.3 seconds. During the same event he would also win the 120-yard Dubbo Gift after starting a yard behind scratch, again displaying his much-publicised speed. 

Irvine's speed was such that he is still considered by many to be the fastest player ever to lace on a boot, and is favorably compared against other noted rugby league speedsters such as Johnny Bliss, Michael Cleary (a 1962 Commonwealth Games 100 yards Bronze Medallist who beat Irvine in a A£2,000 match race at Sydney's Wentworth Park in 1964), Martin Offiah and Darren Albert.

In total, Ken Irvine was selected for three Kangaroo Tours. He toured in 1959-60, 1963-64 where he repeated his feat from 1962 of being the only Australian to score a try in each test of an Ashes series against Great Britain including 3 tries in the 50-12 second test win at Station Road in Swinton in a game that became known as the "Swinton Massacre", and finally 1967-68. Irvine's feat of scoring a try in each test of an Ashes series against Great Britain was later equalled by Sam Backo in 1988 and Mal Meninga in 1990.

Ken Irvine was involved in one of the most talked about and controversial passages of play in rugby league test match history in 1962. In the third Ashes test against Great Britain at the Sydney Cricket Ground, referee Darcy Lawler awarded a try to Irvine late in the game, ignoring a forward pass from Bill Carson amid howls of protest from Lions players. Australian captain Arthur Summons then gave him the goal kicking duties leaving him with a sideline conversion. As he lined the ball up for the kick, Lawler allegedly gave Irvine some 'advice' about how the ball was placed, telling him that he would miss the kick if he didn't line the ball correctly (Irvine denied this in his memoirs, though Lawler maintained until his death in 2004 that it was true). Irvine then moved in and re-adjusted the ball, walked back to his mark and kicked the goal. The goal gave Australia a 17-16 win and in doing so saw to it that they avoided losing the series 3-0 to the tourists after the Lions had won the first test 31-12 in Sydney and the second 17-10 at Lang Park in Brisbane.

Irvine's Test career ended in 1968 when he suffered a broken leg against in the first test against France on the 1967-68 Kangaroo tour at the Stade Vélodrome in Marseille, ruling him out for much of the 1969 NSWRFL season.

Irvine had the honour of captaining the Bears on occasions, although he infamously threatened to lead his team off in protest of referee Keith Page during a 1970 match against Canterbury-Bankstown at Belmore Sports Ground (Norths won the game 9-8). He would go on to make 176 appearances for the side, scoring 171 tries. His stint with the Bears ended at the end of 1970 after disagreements with head coach Roy Francis.  Ken Arthurson who was the club secretary at Manly spoke to the media in 2016 and talked about Irvine's defection to The Northern Beaches club saying "I asked Ken if he had given careful thought about the reprecussions if he left Norths, I said you are a legend there and you are sacrificing so much, I won't be happy until you have given it a lot of deep thought and talked it over with your family".  Irvine reportedly replied that he had burnt his bridges at Norths and there was no going back.

Manly-Warringah Sea Eagles
Irvine was quickly signed by Manly club secretary Ken Arthurson in 1971. The Sea Eagles club Secretary knew the value of adding the games best winger to what was already a quality team that included the likes of Bob Fulton, Fred Jones, Mal Reilly, Bill Hamilton, Graham Eadie and Terry Randall. Irvine went on to make 60 appearances for the club, scoring 41 tries and showed he had lost none of his speed at the end of his career. He overtook Harold Horder as the NSWRFL's all-time top try-scorer, and was finally able to win a premiership when he helped Manly to claim successive premierships in 1972 (19-14 over Eastern Suburbs) and 1973 (10-7 over Cronulla-Sutherland). Irvine didn't score a try in either of his Grand Final wins with the Sea Eagles.

Ken Irvine retired after the 1973 Grand Final win over Cronulla, becoming the first player to score 200 tries in NSWRFL Premiership history. As of April 2018 Irvine holds the record for tries scored in the premiership (212) in front of    Steve Menzies (180), Billy Slater (188), Andrew Ettingshausen (165), Terry Lamb (164) and Brett Stewart (162).

Records and statistics 
Irvine's 212 career tries is the standing NSWRL/NRL career record for the most first grade tries. This tally was achieved in only 236 first grade games and is 22 tries clear of his nearest rival in the rankings: Billy Slater, 32 ahead of  Steve Menzies, and almost 50 ahead of Andrew Ettingshausen, Terry Lamb and Brett Stewart. Menzies, Ettingshausen and Lamb achieved their 160+ totals in 349, 328 and 350 first grade games respectively. Irvine held the record for the highest number of tries scored for a single club, recording 171 tries during 176 games at North Sydney between 1958-1970. However, this was surpassed in 2015 by Melbourne Storm's fullback Billy Slater.

Irvine's 33 tries for Australia was eclipsed by Darren Lockyer during the 2010 Four Nations tournament against Papua New Guinea. Ken Irvine scored his 33 tries in 33 test matches, scoring at the remarkable rate of one try per test.

Point scoring summary

(Note - the above total represents points the total for points at the value they were during Irvine's playing days. Since his retirement, field goals have been reduced from two points to one while tries have increased from three points to four. Adjusted for 2016 figures, Ken Irvine would have scored 989 points in club football)

Career Statistics

Post-playing
Irvine was diagnosed with chronic myeloid leukaemia in 1983. On 22 December 1990, Irvine died of the disease at the age of 50 in Brisbane. North Sydney Oval's Ken Irvine Scoreboard was named in his honour in 1991.

Accolades
Irvine was inducted into the Australian Rugby League Hall of Fame in 2004. In August, 2006 he was named at winger in the North Sydney Bears' Team of the Century.

In 2006 Ken Irvine was named on the wing for the Manly Sea Eagles Dream Team to celebrate the club's 60th anniversary. The team, selected by a panel of selectors which featured former Manly-Warringah administrator Ken Arthurson, respected rugby league writer Ian Heads, the club Chairman Kerry Sibraa and journalist Phil Rothfield, included six of Irvine's teammates from the 1972 and 1973 premiership teams.

In 2007 Irvine was selected by a panel of experts as a winger in an Australian 'Team of the 50s'.

In February 2008, Irvine was named in the list of Australia's 100 Greatest Players (1908–2007) which was commissioned by the  NRL and  ARL to
celebrate the code's centenary year in Australia. Irvine went on to be named as one of the wingers, along with Brian Bevan, in Australian rugby league's Team of the Century. Announced on 17 April 2008, the team is the panel's majority choice for each of the thirteen starting positions and four interchange players. In 2008 New South Wales announced their rugby league team of the century and Irvine was again named on the wing.

Irvine set the world professional sprint record for 100 yards in 1963, running 100 yards (91 m) in 9.3 seconds at Dubbo. He is the only rugby league player to hold a world professional sprint record.

In 2018, the award for the NRL's top tryscorer for the season was named the Ken Irvine Medal, with David Fusitu'a from the New Zealand Warriors being the inaugural winner (with 23 tries)

References

External links
Ken Irvine at northsydneybears.com.au
Ken Irvine at eraofthebiff.com
20th Century Top 10 Rugby League Players

1940 births
1990 deaths
Australian rugby league players
Rugby league players from Sydney
North Sydney Bears players
Manly Warringah Sea Eagles players
Australia national rugby league team players
New South Wales rugby league team players
Rugby league wingers
Deaths from leukemia
Deaths from cancer in Queensland